Adela Blanche Stewart (1846–1910) was a New Zealand homemaker and writer. She was born in Clifton, Gloucestershire (now in Bristol), England in 1846. She and her husband Hugh Stewart emigrated to New Zealand in 1878 and settled at Athenree near Katikati. Katikati was a settlement organised by Hugh's brother George Vesey Stewart. She wrote a book entitled My Simple Life in New Zealand (1908).

References

1846 births
1910 deaths
20th-century New Zealand writers
New Zealand women writers
People from Gloucestershire
English emigrants to New Zealand